The Pakistan Sailing Federation is the national governing body of the sport of sailing in Pakistan. Affiliated with World Sailing and the Asian Sailing Federation, it has its headquarters at the National Sailing Centre in Clifton, Karachi.

History 
Sailing in the Indian subcontinent has been in practice since 1932. The first sailing club, known as the Royal Karachi Yacht Club, was formed at Bunker Island, Manora, Karachi. RKYC was under the control of the British and expatriates since 1947.

After Independence, sailing activities were undertaken by the Karachi Yacht Club. In 1969, the Pakistan Yachting Association (PYA) was formed by Rear Admiral M A K Lodhi, Captain Z U Chaudhry, and Rody Hermes of Karachi Yacht Club.

The name of PYA was changed to Pakistan Sailing Federation in 1996.

Affiliations 
The PSAF is affiliated with:

 World Sailing
 Asian Sailing Federation
 Pakistan Sports Board
 Pakistan Olympic Association

Affiliated organisations 
 Sindh Sailing Association
 Balochistan Sailing / Yachting Association
 Punjab Sailing Association
 Islamabad Sailing Association
 Khyber Pakhtunkhwa Sailing Association
 Pakistan Army
 Pakistan Navy
 Pakistan Railways
 Pakistan Police

References

External links
 

National members of World Sailing
Sailing
1969 establishments in Pakistan
Sailing in Pakistan
Yachting associations
Sailing governing bodies
Sports organizations established in 1969